is a Japanese manga written and illustrated by Nami Akimoto. It was adapted into an anime series by Japan Taps in 1993. Tokyopop licensed the manga for English release in North America.

Plot
Tomomi and Mikage Matsunaga are identical twins with special powers. Together, they are able to teleport and communicate telepathically. The athletically challenged Mikage begs Tomomi to switch identities with her for her school's sports day track meet, where she and Tomomi are teamed with Mikage's arch-enemy Yuya Noda, in the relay race. Tomomi, however, finds herself drawn to Yuya. Tomomi's success in the relay causes the captain of the track team, Hideaki Kurashige, to try to recruit Mikage. So, once again the sisters switch identities. However, the science teacher, Shinichiro Kageura, finds out about their psychic powers, and begins to stalk Tomomi. Sensing that Mikage (who was really Tomomi) has been behaving strangely, Yuya visits them at home.

Characters
Original Japanese names/Names in Tokyopop's translation

/Toni Morgan 

Older twin sister of Mikage, Tomomi is tomboyish, and the more athletic of the two, who once originally attended an all-girls school, but transfers to Mikage's school after she falls in love with Yuya and even eventually begins to get better and is able to communicate telepathically with Mikage, and Yuya to an extent, but is still able to use more powerful abilities when she is in direct contact with her sister.

/Mika Morgan 

Younger twin sister of Tomomi, Mikage is feminine, and the more intellectual of the two, though she was introduced to readers right after blowing up her chemistry work and is currently in love with Hideaki Kurashige and even eventually begins to get better and is able to communicate telepathically with Tomomi, she is able to use more powerful abilities when she is in direct contact with her sister.

/Jackson Neil 

Member of the track team, Yuya develops a romantic relationship with Tomomi.

/Chris Kubrick 

Member of the chemistry club and the track team, Hideaki is Mikage's romantic interest. He gets kidnapped and taken to Marie's kingdom in an attempt to force him to marry her.

A science teacher, Mr. Kageura (also known as Mr. K) is convinced that paranormal abilities exist in the world, and is focused on proving his theories. He has suspicions of Mikage and Tomomi possessing ESP, and will do anything to expose them.

The princess of Diamas who is romantically obsessed with Hideaki and winds up being kidnapped together under her kingdom's orders. She grew up unaware that she has a fraternal twin sister named Emma whom her father took right after their birth due to fears that she would be killed so that Maria could be the sole heir to the throne. She has a snobbish and charismatic personality, who often rivaled and bullied Mikage.

Voiced by: Okimoto Fumiyo and Yumi Tōma
The long lost sister of Maria who has long been hidden by their father. In episode 50, the Matsunaga twins locate and find her to have been under strict protection. Once reunited with Maria, they are revealed to also have the ESP ability. In contrast to her sister, she has a shy and timid personality after a long period of being isolated from the outside world.

A famous paranormal researcher, Mr. X seeks to control paranormal abilities through science.

/Mason Templar 

A member of an organisation of ESP'ers, Mason seeks to bring Mikage and Tomomi to their organization.

Media

Manga
The Miracle Girls manga was licensed for English release by Tokyopop, who released the series from 2000-10-17 until 2003-05-13. It was licensed by Editions Star Comics for Italian released, where it was serialised in Amici. The manga has been released in Spanish by Norma Editorial as Gemelas Milagrosas from December 2004 to June 2006.

Anime

It was adapted into an anime series by Japan Taps in 1993. The anime was dubbed into Italian by DENEB Film where it was broadcast on Canale 5 from March 1996 and on Italia 1. In the Philippines, where it was known as Magic Girls, the show was dubbed in Tagalog and broadcast by ABS-CBN. It is also available in Spanish and Korean.

The series uses three pieces of theme music. The opening themes of the whole series are performed by GARDEN, with "KISU no Tochuu de Namida ga" as the opening for episodes 1-29, and "Koi no Mirai" as the opening for episodes 30–51. Dio performs the ending theme for all 51 episodes, "Futari ja Nakya Dame na no".
The Italian dub used its own opening theme ("È un po' magia per Terry e Maggie" by Cristina D'Avena).

The first two series of the book were not made into anime by any companies, but it started with the third book of Miracle Girls.

Video game
A video game adaptation of Miracle Girls was developed by Now Production and released for the Super Famicom by Takara on October 22, 1993. The player can choose to play as either Mikage or Tomomi and use candies as weapons to stun enemies and use them as platforms which the gameplay is similar to Capcom's Little Nemo for the NES, and when the player clears a level, the player challenges the area boss to a mini-game.

Reception
Adam Arnold of Animefringe praised the series, particularly for the detailed an expressive eyes, and the story "light-hearted and fun to read".

References

External links

 Miracle Girls at TOKYOPOP. (Archive)
 
 
 

1991 manga
1993 anime television series debuts
1993 video games
Action video games
Ajia-do Animation Works
Japan-exclusive video games
Kodansha manga
Magical girl anime and manga
Nippon TV original programming
Now Production games
Romance anime and manga
Shōjo manga
Super Nintendo Entertainment System games
Super Nintendo Entertainment System-only games
Takara video games
Tokyopop titles
Video games based on anime and manga
Video games developed in Japan
Video games featuring female protagonists